William Butler Jr. (December 15, 1924 – March 20, 1991) was an American soul jazz guitarist.

Career
A native of Philadelphia, Butler began his career in the 1940s behind the Harlemaires. In the 1950s he was a member of a trio led by Doc Bagby and accompanied keyboardist Bill Doggett. He co-wrote "Honky Tonk", an R&B hit for Doggett.

Butler also worked with Al Casey, King Curtis,  Eddie "Lockjaw" Davis, Bill Davison, Tommy Flanagan, Panama Francis, Dizzy Gillespie, Benny Goodman, Johnny Hodges, Floyd "Candy" Johnson, David "Fathead" Newman, Houston Person, Sammy Price, Jimmy Smith, Norris Turney, and Dinah Washington.

He is credited as the guitarist on Joey Dee and the Starliters' "Peppermint Twist, Parts 1 & 2" recorded in September 1961 at the Peppermint Lounge in New York City. Part 1 of the song went to the top of the Billboard pop charts in January 1962.

Butler died of a heart attack at home in Teaneck, New Jersey, in 1991.

Discography

As leader
This Is Billy Butler! (Prestige, 1969)
Guitar Soul! (Prestige, 1969)
Yesterday, Today & Tomorrow (Prestige, 1970)
Night Life (Prestige, 1971)
Billy Butler Plays Via Galactica (Kilmarnock, 1973)
Guitar Odyssey with Al Casey, Jackie Williams (Jazz Odyssey, 1974)
Don't Be That Way (Black & Blue, 1976)

As sideman
With Gene Ammons
Brother Jug! (Prestige, 1969)
My Way (Prestige, 1971)

With King Curtis 
Music for Dancing The Twist! (RCA Victor, 1961)
Old Gold (Tru-Sound, 1961)
It's Party Time with King Curtis (Tru-Sound, 1962)
Doing the Dixie Twist (Tru-Sound, 1962)

With Bill Doggett
Moon Dust (King 395–502, 1956)
Hot Doggett (King 395–514, 1956)
As You Desire Me (King 395–523, 1956)
Everybody Dance the Honky Tonk (King 395–531, 1956)
Dame Dreaming (King, 1957)
A Salute to Ellington (King, 1957)
Doggett Beat for Dancing Feet (King, 1957)
Candle Glow (King 563, 1958)
Swingin' Easy (King 582, 1958)
Dance Awhile with Doggett (King 585, 1958)
12 Songs of Christmas (King 600, 1958)
Hold It! (King 609, 1959)
High and Wide (King 633, 1959)
Big City Dance Party (King 641, 1959)
Bill Doggett on Tour [not a live album] (King 667, 1959)
For Reminiscent Lovers, Romantic Songs By Bill Doggett (King 706, 1960)
Back With More Bill Doggett (King 723, 1960)
The Many Moods of Bill Doggett (King 778, 1962)
Bill Doggett Plays American Songs, Bossa Nova Style (King 830, 1963)
Impressions (King 868, 1963)
Wow! (ABC-Paramount, 1964)

With Dizzy Gillespie
The Melody Lingers On (Limelight, 1966)
It's My Way (Solid State, 1969)
Cornucopia (Solid State, 1969)

With John P. Hammond
Big City Blues (Vanguard, 1964)
Mirrors (Vanguard, 1967)

With Johnny Hodges
Blue Pyramid (Verve, 1966) - with Wild Bill Davis
Triple Play (RCA Victor, 1967)

With Illinois Jacquet
Spectrum (Argo, 1965)
The King! (Prestige, 1968)

With Freddie King
Freddie King is a Blues Master (Atlantic, 1969)

With Memphis Slim
Legend of the Blues Vol. 1 (Jubilee, 1967)
The Legacy of the Blues Vol. 7 (Sonet, 1973)

With David "Fathead" Newman
Bigger & Better (Atlantic, 1968)
The Many Facets of David Newman (Atlantic, 1969)

With Houston Person
Goodness! (Prestige, 1969)
Truth! (Prestige, 1970)
Houston Express (Prestige, 1970)

With Jimmy Smith
Hoochie Coochie Man (Verve, 1966)
Peter & the Wolf (Verve, 1966)
Jimmy Smith Plays the Blues (Verve, 1988) - compilation

With Sonny Stitt
Soul Electricity! (Prestige, 1968)
Come Hither (Solid State, 1969)
Goin' Down Slow (Prestige, 1972)
Satan (Cadet, 1974)

With Grady Tate
Windmills of My Mind (Skye, 1968)
Movin' Day (Janus, 1975)

With others
Dedicated to You, The "5" Royales (King, 1957)
Back to the Blues, Dinah Washington (Roulette, 1963)
Tough Talk!, Panama Francis Blues Band (20th Century Fox, 1963)
Soul Outing!, Frank Foster (Prestige, 1966)
Grits & Gravy, Eric Kloss (Prestige, 1966)
Jazz for the Jet Set,  Dave Pike (Atlantic, 1966)
Oliver Nelson Plays Michelle,  Oliver Nelson (Impulse!, 1966)
Soul Drums, Bernard Purdie (Date, 1967)
That Healin' Feelin', Richard "Groove" Holmes (Prestige, 1968)
Workin' on a Groovy Thing, Barbara Lewis (Atlantic, 1968)
I Wish I Knew, Solomon Burke (Atlantic, 1968)
King Solomon,  Solomon Burke (Atlantic, 1968)
Street Man, Barry Goldberg (Buddah, 1969)
The Source, Jimmy Scott (Atlantic, 1969)
Black Is Brown and Brown Is Beautiful, Ruth Brown (Skye, 1969)
Comment, Les McCann (Atlantic, 1970)
Jungle Fire!, Pucho & His Latin Soul Brothers (Prestige, 1970)
Something, Shirley Scott (Atlantic, 1970)
Hard Mother Blues, Ernie Wilkins (Mainstream, 1970)
The Chuck Rainey Coalition, Chuck Rainey (Skye, 1972)
Blacknuss, Rahsaan Roland Kirk (Atlantic, 1972)
Mind's Eye, Jon Lucien (RCA, 1974)
Is Having a Wonderful Time, Geoff Muldaur (Reprise, 1975)
The Doctor is In... and Out, Yusef Lateef (Atlantic, 1976)
Jaws Strikes Again, Eddie "Lockjaw" Davis (Black & Blue, 1976)
Two of Us, Irene Reid (Glades, 1976)
All Right OK You Win, Wild Bill Davis (Black & Blue, 1976) - with Eddie "Lockjaw" Davis
Transformations, Bunky Green (Vanguard, 1977)  
Helen, Helen Humes (Muse, 1980)
What's the Secret of Your Success, The Coasters (Mr. R&B, 1980) - compilation
The Groover, Jimmy McGriff (JAM [Jazz America Marketing], 1982)
Blues 'N' Jazz, B.B. King (MCA, 1983)
One More for the Road, Charles Brown (Alligator, 1989)

References

External links
Discography at Discogs

American jazz guitarists
Soul-jazz guitarists
1924 births
1991 deaths
Prestige Records artists
20th-century American guitarists
Guitarists from Philadelphia
American male guitarists
Jazz musicians from Pennsylvania
20th-century American male musicians
American male jazz musicians
People from Teaneck, New Jersey